The quad singles wheelchair tennis tournament at the 2020 Paralympic Games in Tokyo was held at the Ariake Tennis Park in Kōtō, Tokyo from 28 August to 4 September 2021.

The defending champion was Dylan Alcott, who was the number 1 seed for the tournament. Alcott succeeded in winning the fourth leg of a Golden Slam, having won the Australian Open, French Open and Wimbledon earlier in the year.

Seeds
{{columns-list|colwidth=30em|

Draw

References 

Wheelchair tennis at the 2020 Summer Paralympics